Highway 762 is a provincial secondary highway in the Canadian province of Saskatchewan. It runs from Highway 7 near Vanscoy to Saskatoon.

Highway 762 west of Highway 60 is called Vanscoy Road; the section east of Highway 60 is called Valley Road, which enters Saskatoon on its southwest side and terminates with an interchange (opened in 2013) at Circle Drive; prior to 2013, Valley Road connected with Dundonald Avenue as it entered the city and the highway terminated at an at-grade intersection at 11th Street West. Since the early 2010s the road has provided the main access route to the city's landfill.

Major intersections 
From west to east:

See also 
Roads in Saskatchewan
Transportation in Saskatchewan

References 

762